Best of Scorpions Vol. 2 is a compilation album of songs by the German heavy metal band Scorpions, released on July 10, 1984 in the United States.

Track listing
"Top of the Bill" - 3:22 (from the album In Trance)
"They Need a Million" - 4:47 (from the album Fly to the Rainbow)
"Longing for Fire" - 2:42 (from the album In Trance)
"Catch Your Train" - 3:32 (from the album Virgin Killer)
"Speedy's Coming" (live) - 3:21 (from the album Tokyo Tapes)
"Crying Days" - 4:36 (from the album Virgin Killer)
"All Night Long" (live) - 2:55 (from the album Tokyo Tapes)
"This Is My Song" - 4:07 (from the album Fly to the Rainbow)
"Sun in My Hand" - 4:20 (from the album In Trance)
"We'll Burn the Sky" (live) - 8:16 (from the album Tokyo Tapes)

Charts

References

Scorpions (band) compilation albums
1984 compilation albums
RCA Records compilation albums